Banruo Temple or Bore Temple may refer to:

 Banruo Temple (Changchun), in Changchun, Jilin, China
 Banruo Temple (Shenyang), in Shenyang, Liaoning, China
 Banruo Temple (Dujiangyan), in Puyang Town of Dujiangyan, Sichuan, China
 Banruo Temple (Neijiang), in Dongxing District of Neijiang, Sichuan, China
 Banruo Temple (Xianyang), in Chengguan Town of Qian County, Xianyang, Shaanxi, China
 Banruo Temple (Fenyang), in Yangcheng Township of Fenyang, Shanxi, China
 Banruo Temple (Shaoxing), in Shangyu District of Shaoxing, Zhejiang, China
 Banruo Temple (Shiyan), in Shiyan, Hubei, China